Pigs Can Fly may refer to:

 "Pigs Can Fly", an episode of Piggy Tales
 Pigs Can Fly (song), a song by pop-punk band Busted
 Pigs Can Fly Tour 2016, a concert tour by the same group